Joe Cassells (born 10 October 1954) is an Irish former Gaelic footballer. His league and championship career with the senior Meath county team spanned sixteen seasons from 1974 to 1990.

Born in Navan, County Meath, Cassells first excelled as a Gaelic footballer at club level with Navan O'Mahony's. In a club career that spanned three decades he won a record eight county senior championship medals. Cassells also won two county senior championship medals as a hurler.

Cassells made his debut on the inter-county scene at the age of seventeen when he was selected for the Meath minor team. He enjoyed one championship season with the minor team, ending the year as a Leinster medal winner. Cassells subsequently joined the Meath under-21 team, however, he enjoyed little success in this grade. He made his debut with the Meath senior team during the 1974 championship. Over the course of the next sixteen years, Cassells won back-to-back All-Ireland medals, beginning in 1987 before collecting a second as captain of the team in 1988. He also won four Leinster medals and two National Football League medals. Cassells played his last game for Meath in September 1990.

As a regular member of the Leinster inter-provincial team on a number of occasions, Cassells won back-to-back Railway Cup medals in 1985 and 1986.

In retirement from playing, Cassells became involved in team management and coaching. 

Cassells is the younger brother of trade union leader Peter Cassells.

Career statistics

Honours

Navan O'Mahony's
Meath Senior Football Championship (8): 1973, 1979, 1981, 1985, 1987, 1988, 1989, 1990
Meath Senior Hurling Championship (2): 1985, 1986

Meath
All-Ireland Senior Football Championship (2): 1987, 1988 (c)
Leinster Senior Football Championship (4): 1986 (c), 1987, 1988 (c), 1990
National Football League (2): 1974-75, 1987-88 (c)
Centenary Cup (1): 1984 (c)
Leinster Minor Football Championship (1): 1972

Leinster
Railway Cup (2): 1985, 1986

References

 

1954 births
Living people
All-Ireland-winning captains (football)
Meath inter-county Gaelic footballers
Navan O'Mahoneys Gaelic footballers
Leinster inter-provincial Gaelic footballers
People from Navan
Winners of two All-Ireland medals (Gaelic football)